1 Day is a 2009 British crime film about gangs and their communities in inner city Birmingham. The story follows Flash as he attempts to get £100,000 to his boss Angel in less than 24 hours or face certain death. Directed by Penny Woolcock, the film is street-cast and features no professional actors. It stars Dylan Duffus, Duncan Tobias, Yohance Watson, and Ohran Whyte.

Plot
Flash (Dylan Duffus) receives a phone call from Angel (Yohance Watson) announcing that he's being released early from prison and wants the £500,000 he's left Flash for safekeeping. Flash is £100,000 short of the full amount and is pushed for time. Flash is forced to strike a deal with Evil (Duncan Tobias) who more than lives up to his name. The movie follows Flash's race against time as he is pursued by a rival gang called The Zampa Boys as Flash is part of OSC (Old Street Crew). He is also pressured by his three irate baby mothers and his grandmother.

Cast
 Dylan Duffus	 as	Flash
 Duncan Tobias	 as	Evil
 Yohance Watson	 as Angel
 Ohran Whyte	 as	Pest
 Monica Ffrench as Nanny
 Lady Leshurr as Shakia
 Chris Wilson	 as	Prison Officer
 Malik MD7 as  El Presidente

Reception
The film has received a mixed reception amongst film critics.

In Birmingham it was withdrawn from the Odeon Cinemas chain, on the advice of the West Midlands Police. The West Midlands Police say they did not give such a statement.

See also 
 List of hood films

References

External links
 

2009 films
British crime drama films
2000s English-language films
2009 crime drama films
British independent films
Hood films
Vertigo Films films
Films set in Birmingham, West Midlands
Black British films
2009 independent films
2000s American films
2000s British films